Kentucky elected its members August 2, 1824.

See also 
 1825 Kentucky's 3rd congressional district special election
 1824 and 1825 United States House of Representatives elections
 List of United States representatives from Kentucky

Notes 

1824
Kentucky
United States House of Representatives